The men's 100 metre backstroke event at the 2010 Asian Games took place on 16 November 2010 at Guangzhou Aoti Aquatics Centre.

There were 29 competitors from 19 countries who took part in this event. Four heats were held, with most containing the maximum number of swimmers (eight). The heat in which a swimmer competed did not formally matter for advancement, as the swimmers with the top eight times from the entire field qualified for the finals.

Ryosuke Irie and Junya Koga from Japan finished with one and two, Sun Xiaolei from China won the bronze medal.

Schedule
All times are China Standard Time (UTC+08:00)

Records

Results

Heats

Final

References
 16th Asian Games Results

External links 
 Men's 100m Backstroke Heats Official Website
 Men's 100m Backstroke Ev.No.24 Final Official Website

Swimming at the 2010 Asian Games